Tery or Téry is a surname. Notable people with this surname include:

 Moshe Tery, Israeli politician
 Simone Téry (1897–1967), French journalist
 Ödön Téry (1890–1981), Hungarian gymnast

See also
 Terry